Fleet Logistics Support Squadron 59 (VR-59), nicknamed The Lone Star Express, is a transport squadron of the Fleet Logistics Support Wing of the United States Navy Reserve, based at Naval Air Station Joint Reserve Base Fort Worth, Texas. It is a reserve unit composed of both active duty and Selected Reserve sailors.  The squadron maintains three modified Boeing Next-Generation 737-700C aircraft, designated as the C-40A Clipper.

Mission 

The mission statement of VR-59 is "Navy unique fleet essential airlift providing around the clock worldwide logistics support to all military services, flying three C-40A Clippers."

For the month of May 2008 the squadron flew over 350 hours.

See also
 History of the United States Navy
 List of United States Navy aircraft squadrons

References

External links
C-40A Clipper U.S. Navy fact file
Fleet Logistics Support Squadron 59 (VR-59) at GlobalSecurity.org
Squadron hangar and aircraft as seen on Google Maps

Fleet logistics support squadrons of the United States Navy